Malcolm Joseph McDonald (April 9, 1888 – May 30, 1963) was a Major League Baseball third baseman who played in  with the St. Louis Browns.

External links

1888 births
1963 deaths
Major League Baseball third basemen
Baseball players from Texas
St. Louis Browns players
Sportspeople from Galveston, Texas
Jonesboro Zebras players
Shreveport Pirates (baseball) players
Austin Senators players
Topeka Jayhawks players
Nashville Vols players
Houston Buffaloes players
Buffalo Bisons (minor league) players
Minneapolis Millers (baseball) players
Drumright Oilers players
St. Joseph Saints players
Sioux City Packers players